Dabney Carr (October 26, 1743 – May 16, 1773) was a member of the Virginia House of Burgesses and was married to Martha Jefferson, the sister of Thomas Jefferson. He introduced the Committee of correspondence in Virginia which was a leading factor in the formation of the Continental Congress in 1774. Carr and Jefferson were good friends and, fulfilling a boyhood promise, was buried in the Monticello graveyard. His sons included politicians Peter and Samuel Carr and Judge Dabney Carr.

Early life and education

Carr was born on October 26, 1743, to John Carr (1706–1778) and his second wife, Barbara Overton Carr (died 1794), daughter of Captain James and Elizabeth Overton. He was born at Bear Castle, a large farm in Louisa County, Virginia. His father John, who attained the title of Colonel, was a justice and sheriff in Louisa County. Carr descended from early settlers and men who performed public service and had large landholdings throughout Virginia. Dabney had an older half-brother, Thomas. His other siblings were Samuel, Overton, Garland, Mary, and Elizabeth.

He was educated at Rev. James Maury's School, where he met Thomas Jefferson. Maury taught James Madison, James Monroe, Thomas Jefferson, three of the country's presidents, and two other signers of the United States Declaration of Independence. The school was conducted in a log cabin in Albemarle County. They were taught geography, history, mathematics, literature, classics, and manners and morals. Both Jefferson and Carr studied law at College of William & Mary. During his education, he also became friends of John Taylor and James Madison.

After he became close friends with Jefferson, he often went home on weekends to Shadwell and also became close friends with two of Jefferson's sisters, Martha and Jane. The young men often rode horses through what they called Tom's mountain, which became Monticello.

Marriage and children

Carr married Jefferson's younger sister, Martha Jefferson (May 29, 1746 - September 3, 1811), on July 20, 1765, and they lived in Goochland County at his plantation, Spring Forest.

Their children were:
 Jean Barbara Carr (1766-1840) also sometimes referred to as Jane or Jenny married Wilson Cary (1760-1793)
 Lucy Carr (March 7, 1768 – 1803) m. Richard Terrell (died 1802) on 5 October 1792
 Mary (Polly) Carr (born March 7, 1768), twin sister of Lucy, never married
 Peter Carr (1770-1815) m. Hetty Smith (1767-1834)
 Colonel Samuel Carr of Dunlora (October 8, 1771 – 1855) married first Eleanor B. Carr (died 1815), and then married Maria Dabney
 Judge Dabney Carr (1773-1837) married Elizabeth Carr

Impressed with the Carr's family life, Jefferson wrote, "...in a very small house, with a table, half a dozen chairs, and one or two servants... [Dabney] is the happiest man in the universe. Every incident in life he so takes as to render it a source of pleasure, with as much benevolence as the heart of a man will hold, but with an utter neglect of the costly apparatus of life, he exhibits to the world a new phenomenon in philosophy—the Samian sage in the tab of the cynic."

Career
As a young man, in 1763, Carr served in the Volunteer Rangers under Captain Phillips and received a land bounty for his service. Carr practice law in Louisa, Goochland, Albemarle, Chesterfield, and Augusta Counties of Virginia. Patrick Henry considered Carr his greatest competitor as a lawyer. In 1771, Louisa County voters elected Carr to the Virginia House of Burgesses and re-elected him in 1772. Relations between the colonists and the King of England were contentious by 1773 and a special session of the House of Burgesses was held by John Murray, Lord Dunmore, the governor of Virginia. On March 12, 1773, Carr proposed the creation of an inter-colony Committee of correspondence to help coordinate communication between Virginia and other colonies. He made a "forceful and eloquent speech" before the other members and the plan was adopted. The next day, a standing committee, with Carr as one of the members, began corresponding with other colonies. This became a factor in the creation of the Continental Congress in 1774.

Death

He died of a fever soon afterward, on May 16, 1773, a few weeks after the birth of his sixth child, Dabney Carr, and Thomas Jefferson finished his legislative term. Pursuant to a boyhood promise, Jefferson buried Carr on the grounds of Monticello, the first person to be buried there, and ultimately next to Jefferson. His grave marker notes that Jefferson "of all men, loved him most."

At the time of his death, Dabney and Martha's children ranged in age from three weeks (Dabney) to six years (Jane). Jefferson helped Carr's widow to raise their children, including overseeing their education. Martha, who became known as "Aunt Carr," and her children were often at Monticello. She was an active presence there, particularly after the death of Jefferson's wife, Martha. She was described as "a gifted woman, and every way worthy of her husband; and their married life was one of peculiar felicity." After what Thomas Jefferson described as "wasting complaint which has for two or three years been gaining upon her," Martha Jefferson Carr died in September 1811 and was buried at the Monticello family graveyard next to her husband and the obelisk for Jefferson.

Notes

References

Further reading
  — arrangements following Carr's death

External links

1743 births
1773 deaths
College of William & Mary alumni
House of Burgesses members
Burials at Monticello
People from Louisa County, Virginia
Jefferson family
Virginia colonial people